Laminated Denim is the 22nd studio album by Australian psychedelic rock band King Gizzard & the Lizard Wizard, released on 12 October 2022; five days after their previous album Ice, Death, Planets, Lungs, Mushrooms and Lava. 

The album's title is an anagram of the title of the band’s 19th album, Made in Timeland, whose digital release coincided with the release of Laminated Denim. Described by the band as a "spiritual successor" to Made in Timeland, Laminated Denim features two 15-minute songs written around the ticking of a clock, but featuring more rock-focused instrumentals with heavy use of polyrhythms and a Motorik beat. Its psychedelic and progressive rock sound differs from the electronic-based Timeland.

Background and recording
On 18 June 2022, the band posted a tweet promising three more albums by the end of 2022. More details came on 12 July, when it was reported that the first two of these were "built from all six members jamming for hours", similarly to the recording process of "The Dripping Tap" from Omnium Gatherum.

On 7 September, the band revealed the titles, cover artwork, and release dates for their next three albums: Ice, Death, Planets, Lungs, Mushrooms and Lava would be released on 7 October; Laminated Denim on 12 October; and Changes on 28 October.

Laminated Denim was the first album finished of the three records the band released in October. After the recording sessions for "The Dripping Tap", the band continued to record together again, spending more in the studio to jam. Following the positive experience recording this album, the band decided to continue working in this way, recording the preceding album Ice, Death, Planets, Lungs, Mushrooms and Lava.

Lead vocalist and multi-instrumentalist Stu Mackenzie noted that the two songs on Laminated Denim are among his favourites: "Sometimes the boundaries you set for yourself kind of force you into a creative place that you wouldn't have usually gone to or been comfortable with".

Release
In anticipation of the album's release, it was revealed that copies of Laminated Denim would be available on their show at Red Rocks, on 10 October, two days ahead of the album's official release.

Reception

In the review for AllMusic, Tim Sendra described the album as being, "perfect for taking up time until the stars of the show return to the stage. Does it make for good home listening? Is it King Gizzard at their best? yes, and not exactly. It certainly slots in a level below their more considered releases, but if one is fully onboard with the King Gizzard experience, Laminated Denim is certainly worth adding to an ever expanding collection of works."

Writing for The Fire Note, Simon Workman claimed that "The music slowly blossoms as each track unfolds, layers of guitars and keyboards weaving melodic lines beneath Stu Mackenzie’s familiar falsetto. While Ice, Death, Planets, Lungs, Mushrooms and Lava felt proggy, jazzy, and funky at times, Laminated Denim’s jams are more psychedelic, with Michael Cavanaugh’s motorik krautrock beat anchoring the rest of the band’s explorations."

Track listing
All tracks written by Stu Mackenzie, Ambrose Kenny-Smith, Joey Walker, Cook Craig and Michael Cavanagh.

Personnel
King Gizzard & the Lizard Wizard 
 Ambrose Kenny-Smith – keyboards, percussion, vocals , harmonica 
 Michael Cavanagh – drums, percussion 
 Cook Craig – guitar , bass 
 Joey Walker – guitar, bass, synthesizer 
 Lucas Harwood – keyboards 
 Stu Mackenzie – vocals, guitar, keyboards, percussion , synthesizer , bass, flute 

Production
 Stu Mackenzie – recording, production, mixing
 Joseph Carra – mastering
 Jason Galea – artwork

Charts

References

2022 albums
King Gizzard & the Lizard Wizard albums